Electric Honey was founded in 1992 and is Glasgow Kelvin College's in-house record label run by Ken McCluskey (The Bluebells), Douglas MacIntyre (Creeping Bent) and formerly Alan Rankine (The Associates) along with students from the HNC/D Music Business course. The label celebrated its 25th year in 2017 with many events including the release of the debut album "Any Joy" from Scottish six-piece indie rock band; "Pronto Mama."

The label was described by Uncut magazine as being "The most successful student-run label in the world", thanks to the history of artists having releases with the imprint, including Belle & Sebastian, Snow Patrol and Biffy Clyro.

Affiliate labels were also run under Electric Honey for a period of time. Gdansk, which released electronic-based artists and Root 8 which specialised in world music.

Early years
The label was founded by staff at Stow College with the idea of creating a platform for students in the HNC/D Music Business course, to gain the experience of working firsthand with record company operations, while also having a hand in the creation of a thriving music scene within Scotland by releasing local artists. The first release was in 1993 with Baby Chaos, later known as Deckard, and their Buzz EP. Baby Chaos would then go on to receive considerable recognition from their releases with their 1996 album Love Your Self Abuse, being named one of Kerrang!'''s 100 Greatest British Rock Albums Ever. The 1995 release of The Moondials, featured Stevie Jackson on guitar, who would go on to join Belle & Sebastian alongside Stuart Murdoch later that year.

1996/2000
Belle and Sebastian
Electric Honey's first success came with the release of the label's first album release in 1996, Belle & Sebastian's Tigermilk, named after a track originally written for, but left out from, the album. Formed by Stuart Murdoch and Stuart David, later joined with Stevie Jackson, Belle & Sebastian formed in Glasgow in early 1996, recording their first demos in Stow College. Murdoch was involved early on with the University of Glasgow's Subcity Radio. Originally limited to 1000 copies on Electric Honey, the album was picked up by Jeepster Records who re-released it in 1999, and is now often cited as a classic influential album, with "The State I Am In" being placed at number 17 on Pitchfork Media's top 200 tracks of the 1990s.
Belle and Sebastian recently played a special gig at Winfield House- the London residence of the US Ambassador to the United Kingdom.

Snow Patrol
Originally called Polarbear, Snow Patrol are the most successful of Electric Honey's signings having sold ten million albums worldwide. The band formed in Glasgow while front-man Gary Lightbody worked in the Glasgow venue Nice 'n' Sleazys. Starfighter Pilot came five years before their big selling album Final Straw, and featured Belle & Sebastian's Stuart Murdoch on piano and backing vocals.
 Starfighter Pilot was later featured on the band's debut album Songs for Polarbears and re-released as a single through Jeepster Records.

Biffy Clyro
Biffy Clyro were signed to the label while they were students at Stow College. In 2000, they released their debut EP Thekidswhopoptodaywillrocktomorrow through Electric Honey, featuring the tracks "57" and "Justboy".
Both tracks reappeared on the band's debut album release, Blackened Sky, through Beggars Banquet Records.

 Label Timeline 

Gdansk

Artists

 Found
 Ziggy Campbell
 Mylo
 Stafrann Hakon
 We Yo Nee
 Vin Landers
 Beatmooks
 ESC
 Monkey Tribe
 Mellow Sub Machine
 Tetsuo
 Kev Sim
 Fudge Fingas
 The Smash

 Dullshiny
 Reaz
 Disciples of Panic Earth
 Lyvonne
 K Trouble
 Cannon
 Scientific Support Dept.
 Spacewalker
 C.D Jefferson
 Cruiser
 S-Type
 Tycho
 Provinylistkarim
 Nordin Zaoui

Discography

Compilations
 Lato 001 (2003)
 Lato 002 (2004)
 Lato 003 Lato 004 Lato 005 (2006)

Albums
Mellow Sub Machine – Los Machinos Mellos (2005)

Root 8

Artists
 Koshka
 Mungo's Hi-Fi
 Lee Patterson
 Red Road Global Music Collective
 Zuba 
 Roddy Hart

Discography
 Welcome'' (2005)

See also
 List of Record Labels
 List of independent UK record labels
 Scottish Music

References

External links
 French Wives
 Woodenbox With A Fistful Of Fivers
 White Heath
 Stow College

Scottish record labels
Indie rock record labels
1992 establishments in Scotland